Jerzy Bielecki (28 March 1921, Słaboszów – 20 October 2011, Nowy Targ) was a Polish Catholic social worker, best known as one of the few inmates of the Auschwitz concentration camp who managed to escape successfully. With the help of other resistance members in the camp, he escaped in 1944 together with his Jewish girlfriend, who was an inmate of Auschwitz II. In 1985 Bielecki received the Righteous Among the Nations award. He also co-founded and headed the postwar Christian Association of the Auschwitz Families.

Biography
Bielecki was born in 1921 in Słaboszów, Poland. A pupil at a gymnasium in Kraków, at the outbreak of World War II, he decided to join the Polish Army in the West. While crossing the border with Hungary on 7 May 1940, en route to trying to join up with the Polish Army stationed in France, he was caught and arrested by the Gestapo on the false suspicion that he was a resistance fighter. A month later, on 14 June 1940, he was sent to the newly created Auschwitz concentration camp with the first transport of 728 Polish political prisoners. (His concentration camp number is 243). His decent knowledge of the German language allowed him to work, among other jobs at various times, at a mill (grain) warehouse in Babice (future subcamp of Auschwitz) as a clerk, where he had occasional access to additional food and came in contact with the Polish anti-Nazi resistance, the Home Army.

Escape from Auschwitz
Assigned to an Arbeitskommando at Auschwitz, Bielecki met Cyla Cybulska at a grain warehouse, serving with the women repairing burlap sacks. She was a Jewish inmate of Auschwitz-Birkenau (Auschwitz II) since 19 January 1943, (concentration camp number 29558) deported from the ghetto in Zambrów. Despite the fact that men and women were not allowed to talk to each other, the two managed to exchange a few words every day, and they fell in love. Cyla's family had already been murdered.

With time, he secretly collected the necessary supplies for an escape. On 21 July 1944 they managed to cross the camp's gate together using a faked green pass, prepared by Bielecki. He was dressed in an SS uniform, assembled from parts of German uniforms bearing the Rottenführer insignia, stolen by Tadeusz Srogi (concentration camp number 178, a friend he made during transport to the camp), who had also supplied the form for the pass. At various points along the journey, Cyla wanted to give up, but Bielecki coaxed and supported her through it, and promised that they both would survive the ordeal. Jerzy and Cyla walked through the fields for ten days.

Cybulska was initially hidden at Bielecki's uncle's house at Przemęczany, where Bielecki's mother also lived, and later by his friends, the Czernik family, in a nearby Gruszów village. They treated her like their own daughter. Bielecki himself joined the Home Army. Towards the end of the war he and Cyla separated; Bielecki went into hiding in Krakow, hoping to improve their chances against being recaptured, and they planned to reunite after the war.

As Monika Ścisłowska reported, for the Associated Press: 

Cyla was informed that he had been killed during Operation Tempest, while he was told she had left the country and died in Sweden.

Post-war
It was not until May 1983, in New York, that Cybulska accidentally learned that Bielecki was alive and well when a Polish woman cleaning her family's apartment mentioned a documentary in which she had seen them recount his story. Cyla acquired his phone number, and the couple met the following month in Poland, on 8 June 1983, for the first time since the war ended.

As Monika Ścisłowska reported for the Associated Press: 

After the war, Bielecki co-founded and became the honorary chairman of the Christian Association of the Auschwitz Families. He was also inscribed on the list of the Righteous Among the Nations (in 1985), and became an honorary citizen of Israel. Cyla died in 2005. He died in Nowy Targ on 20 October 2011. His escape from the camp with Cybulska was described in a number of documentaries and books, including Bielecki's own autobiography, Kto ratuje jedno życie... (He who saves one life...) (1990).

See also
 The Holocaust in Poland
 Remembrance (2011 film)

References

External links
  Jerzy Bielecki.com

1921 births
2011 deaths
Escapees from Auschwitz
Polish Righteous Among the Nations
People from Miechów County
Home Army members